Archbold's nightjar (Eurostopodus archboldi), also known as the mountain eared-nightjar or cloud-forest nightjar, is a species of nightjar in the family Caprimulgidae.  It is found in the highlands of New Guinea. Its natural habitat is subtropical or tropical moist montane forests.  It is named after American explorer Richard Archbold.

References

Archbold's nightjar
Birds of New Guinea
Archbold's nightjar
Archbold's nightjar
Taxonomy articles created by Polbot